Peter Kaiser is governor of Carinthia.

Peter Kaiser may also refer to:
 Peter Kaiser (historian) (1793–1864), statesman and historian from Liechtenstein
 Peter Kaiser (musher) (born 1987), American dog musher of Yup'ik ancestry
Petrus Leopold Kaiser (1788–1848), also called Peter, bishop of Mainz
Peter Kaiser, artist and member of the Merioola Group
Peter Kaiser, civil partner of New Zealand's first openly gay member of parliament, Chris Carter